The Art of Love & War is the fourth studio album by American singer Angie Stone. It was released on October 15, 2007, by Stax Records. Its lead single, "Baby" (featuring Betty Wright), debuted at number 18 on the Billboard Bubbling Under Hot 100 Singles chart, later peaking at number three, and also peaked at number 22 on the Hot R&B/Hip-Hop Songs chart.

Background
In June 2004, Stone released Stone Love, her second studio album with J Records. While it debuted at number 14 on the US Billboard 200 and entered the top twenty in Belgium, Finland, Sweden and the Netherlands, the album was commercially less successful than its predecessors Black Diamond (1999) and Mahogany Soul (2001) both of whom had become gold-sellers in the United Kingdom and the United States. The following year, Stone began recording what as expected to become her fifth regular album, but to save costs J Records asked her to transfer her new material, including the previously unreleased single "I Wasn't Kidding", to a compilation album halfway through the recording process. Speaking volumes to her what her future with the company would be, Stone subsequently asked for and received an unconditional release from the label. Her third full-length release, the compilation Stone Hits: The Very Best of Angie Stone, released in June 2005, marked her final release with the company. The following year, Stone was approached by the reworked Stax Records and signed with the label.

Critical reception

The Art of Love & War received mixed reviews from music critics. At Metacritic, which assigns a normalized rating out of 100 to reviews from mainstream publications, the album received an average score of 60, based on 11 reviews. AllMusic rated the album three and a half stars out of five and complimented the track listing for its "nods to classic styles, blending funk, soul, balladry, and R&B in one tasty package", adding: "Yet The Art of Love & War is contemporary through and through. Shimmering with a modern, digital production sheen, the album is clearly steeped in urban contemporary R&B, more lush and languid than stripped down and raw. Stone is no mere puppet of the past: her voice, delivery, and feel are all her own, whether on butter-smooth love songs or hard-swinging groovers." Billboard wrote that the album "emphasizes gratitude above anything else [...] Stone remains impressive as a vocalist, an old-school soul with an understated delivery that's more hushed than histrionic."

Prefix called the album "one of the best neo-soul albums to come out in years" and wrote: "About ten of the album's tracks are produced in a similar style, channeling the musical complexity of the '70s over a simple funky track. The formula works well, so when the album moves away from this style [...] it's a bit of a jolt [...] The strength of the album rests not on one aspect. From the dense lyrics spanning a wealth of topics to the perfect production, The Art of Love & War proves that Stone isn't going anywhere. Jon Pareles, writer for The New York Times noted that "love decisively outnumbers war as the subject of songs on The Art of Love and War, as Angie Stone luxuriates in the ways her voice can warm and soothe a melody." He felt that the album "is filled with lush, suavely undulating ballads that have Ms. Stone cooing quietly and intimately."

Maddy Costa of The Guardian found that The Art of Love and War "radiates beatific, confident optimism [...] You can't blame [Stone] for indulging in a little self-adulation, not least when she does so with such musical grace [...]  but that mood of indulgence also leads to a surfeit of mellifluous vocals, syrupy beats and billowing, sugary melodies that makes the album cloy." Mike Joseph from PopMatters noted that "even though you wish Stone would broaden her sonic palette just a little bit, there's something to be said for knowing your lane and staying in it." He felt that with The Art of Love and War, "Stone provides the perfect midpoint between vets like Gladys Knight and Chaka Khan and the younger divas like Mary J. Blige and Keyshia Cole. It's old-school soul with just a pinch of contemporary flavor [...] Although she could occasionally use a co-lyricist, The Art of Love & War marks yet another solid entry into the musical canon of an under appreciated vocalist."

Commercial performance
The Art of Love & War debuted at number 11 on the US Billboard 200 with 45,000 copies sold in its first week, becoming Stone's highest-charting album to date.

Track listing

Notes
  signifies an additional producer
  signifies a co-producer

Sample credits
 "Baby" contains elements of "Give Me Your Love (Love Song)" by Curtis Mayfield. 
 "My People" contains elements from "My People" by Duke Ellington.
 "Play wit It" contains elements of "Hang It Up" by Patrice Rushen.

Charts

Weekly charts

Year-end charts

Release history

Notes

References

2007 albums
Angie Stone albums
Stax Records albums